Janayugom is a Malayalam daily newspaper published in Kerala, India. It is the official organ of the Kerala State Council of the Communist Party of India. It is the first newspaper in India using free software. Originally  started in 1947 as a weekly magazine from Quilon to propagate the news and views of the party, On 1953 November 16 
it was converted as a daily newspaper. 

The first editor was N. Gopinathan Nair (alias Velya Gopi) and the first manager R. Gopinathan Nair (alias Kochu Gopi). M.N. Govindan Nair, a senior figure in the Communist Party of India, supported the conversion of the publication from a weekly to a daily newspaper. By the 1950s, the Janayugom daily newspaper also was started and by the 70s the Janayugom family of publications had expanded to include Cinerama, a film weekly, Balayugom, a children's monthly and Janayugom Novelpathippu, a literary magazine. Later, all of these publications stopped one by one and only a monthly magazine from Calicut remained. In 2007 Janayugom was rejuvenated, now as a daily news paper. Marxist theoreticians like C. Unniraja have been its chief editors. Its chief editor is Kanam Rajendran and editor is Rajaji Mathew Thomas .

Free/open-source software

In November 2019, the newspaper migrated to open-source software. All desktops were moved to Kubuntu Linux, all image editing was moved to GIMP and all desktop publishing was moved to Scribus. Savings from the use of free software was over 10 million Indian Rupees ($130,000).

Supplements
 Vaarantham
 Sahapadi 
 Sthreeyugom
 Yuvakalasahithi

See also
List of Malayalam-language newspapers
List of Malayalam-language periodicals
List of newspapers in India

References 

Communist Party of India
Communist newspapers
History of Kollam
Malayalam-language newspapers
Mass media in Kerala
Daily newspapers published in India
Publications established in 1947
1947 establishments in India
Communist periodicals published in India